Curse of the Zodiac is a 2007 American horror film from Lionsgate, written and directed by Ulli Lommel, inspired by the true story of the hunt for a notorious serial killer known as "Zodiac" who claimed responsibility for the still unsolved murders.

It stars Cassandra Church and Jack Quinn, and was released directly to DVD.

Plot
The Zodiac Killer (Jack Quinn) terrorizes the San Francisco Bay area in the early 1970s. He murders random people and uses cryptic symbols and coded messages to taunt the media and the San Francisco Police, leaving the people of San Francisco in fear.

Cast
Jack Quinn
Cassandra Church
Jon E. Nimetz
Victoria Ullmann
Lyn Beausoleil
Colette Clair

Reception 

A half-point out of a possible five was given to the film by Jon Condit of Dread Central, who concluded, "The sorry fact is that Curse of the Zodiac is a total mess". David Johnson of DVD Verdict heavily criticized Curse of the Zodiac, writing, "The movie plays out like this: Zodiac Killer wanders around, the camera shakes a lot, he kills a girl, the camera shakes a lot, the psychic gets a headache and has a vision of the crime scene, the camera shakes a lot, Zodiac calls the journalist and talks trash, the camera shakes a lot and repeat x4. Even if you're able to penetrate the insane editing, the narrative within will almost certainly bore your migraine-having ass. Add to that, the acting is universally atrocious—the scenes with the psychic and her boyfriend are a case study on how to miss cues and flub lines". Bloody Disgusting's Brian W. Collins included Curse of the Zodiac on his 10 Worst Horror Films of 2007 list, in which he stated, "Not getting a single detail right about the Zodiac (other than the setting) is the least of its problems. It took effort to even get through the entire film, which consisted mainly of 3 scenes repeated over and over (killer taunts the cop, killer taunts the girl, killer kills some hippies we have never seen before)". Garrett and Sean Neil of Something Awful awarded a near "perfect" score of -49/-50, and described the film as nothing more than "a twisted labyrinth of spinning, out-of-focus cameras and pointless gibberish".

References

External links
 

American serial killer films
American films based on actual events
Films set in the 1970s
Crime films based on actual events
Films set in San Francisco
2007 direct-to-video films
Films directed by Ulli Lommel
2007 horror films
2007 films
Cultural depictions of the Zodiac Killer
2000s English-language films
2000s American films